Constructa may refer to:

 a digitized form of Tower (typeface), a slab serif  typeface
Constructa (company), a German manufacturer of major appliances